AZ Canis Minoris is a variable star in the equatorial constellation of Canis Minor. It is just visible to the naked eye in good viewing conditions as a dim, white-hued star with an apparent visual magnitude of around 6.46. The star is located around 500 light years away from the Sun based on parallax, and is drifting further away with a radial velocity of +15 km/s. No evidence has been found for a companion to this star, although in the past it has been reported as a binary star system.

This star has a stellar classification of A5 IV, matching an A-type subgiant star. The variable nature of this star was discovered in 1970 at Kitt Peak Observatory. AZ Canis Minoris is nearly a billion years old with a projected rotational velocity of 44 km/s. It has 1.9 times the mass of the Sun and 3.8 times the Sun's radius. The star is radiating 48 times as much luminosity as the Sun from its photosphere at an effective temperature of 7,783 K.

References

A-type subgiants
Delta Scuti variables

Canis Minor
Durchmusterung objects
062437
037705
2989
Canis Majoris, AZ